Miss Platnum (born Ruth Maria Renner; 27 September 1980), formerly known as Platnum, is a Romanian-German singer, songwriter and musician, currently signed to Virgin Records Germany.

Biography

Early life
Platnum was born in Timișoara, Romania to a Romanian father with German roots and a Romanian mother. At the age of eight her family relocated to West Berlin where she went to school in Berlin-Lichterfelde. Later on she took lessons in singing with Jocelyn B. Smith and worked as a background singer for Moabeat.

Works
After her minorly successful debut album Rock Me which was released on 31 January 2005 on the Berlin-based Indie label Sonar Kollektiv, Platnum released her second album Chefa in May 2007, under her new artist name Miss Platnum. Produced by Die Krauts, it distinguished itself through a mixture of hip-hop, soul, R&B, pop and Romanian Musical elements. Its lead single, "Give Me the Food" reached the top 20 of the Romanian Singles Chart, and debuted at No. 63 on the German Singles Chart.

Discography

Albums

EPs 
 Lila Wolken (2012)
 Hüftgold Berlin (2014)

Singles

References

External links

 
 
 Miss Platnum at Discogs.com
 Four Music artist page (as Miss Platnum)
 Sonar Kollektiv artist page (as Platnum)
 10 Fragen an Miss Platnum 

1980 births
Living people
German soul singers
Romanian emigrants to Germany
English-language singers from Germany
Sonar Kollektiv artists
Participants in the Bundesvision Song Contest
21st-century German women singers